is a Japanese manga artist and illustrator born 15 February 1945 in Kobe, Hyōgo Prefecture, Japan. Outside of being an illustrator for numerous posters, books, and other works, he is most well known for his dramatic romance manga Heart Cocktail, which had sold over 5 million copies.

He won the 1974 Shogakukan Big Comic Prize. In 1987, Watase received the Bungeishunjū Manga Award for his work .

In addition to various exhibits in Japan, Watase held his first major exhibit in the United States at the Japanese American Cultural and Community Center in Los Angeles, California in 1998.

Biography
From shortly after birth until high school, Watase lived in Kitakyūshū, Fukuoka Prefecture. He attended Meiji Gakuen Junior High (a private school), then graduated to the Fukuoka Prefectural Kokura Senior High School before finally graduating from Waseda University with a degree in law.

Watase was awarded the 1974 Shogakukan Big Comic Prize. His Heart Cocktail manga series, considered to be representative of his work, began publication in Kodansha's manga magazine Weekly Morning in 1983. This series ran for six years and was adapted into an anime television series aired on NTV from October 1986 until March 1988. Jazz and fusion musician Naoya Matsuoka collaborated with him on the series. The series was also adapted into a two-episode television drama special in 1986.

After working for over 16 years at Dowa Fire and Marine Insurance Company, he retired in 1985 to work on his manga and illustration. Watase received the Bungeishunjū Manga Award in 1987 for Phillip, P.I.

Works
Watase has worked in a variety of formats, including manga, book illustration, concept illustration, as well as poster and advertising illustration. Some of his manga are also essays or commentary on specific topics.

Manga
 (1983, 11 volumes, Kodansha)
 (1985, 1 volume, Kadokawa Shoten)
 (1985)
 (1986, 1 volume, Jitsugyo no Nihon Sha)
 (1987-, Kobunsha)
 (1987)
 (1989)

 (1987, 1 volume, Kadokawa Shoten)
Ken & Jun (1987–1989, 2 volumes, Takeshobo)
 (1987–1989, 3 volumes, Kadokawa Shoten)
 (1989, 1 volume, Kadokawa Shoten)
 (1989, 1 volume, Kodansha)
 (1990, 1 volume, Kadokawa Shoten)
 (1993–1998, 12 volumes, Kodansha)
 (1999, 2 volumes, Kodansha)
 (2000–2002, 4 volumes, Kodansha)
 (2003–2005, 3 volumes, Kodansha)
Tokyo Blue (2005, 1 volume, Softbank)
Heart Cocktail Eleven (2006, 1 volume, Kodansha)
Heart Station (2006, 1 volume, Kobunsha)
The Motorcycle Letters (2006, 1 volume, Jitsugyo no Nihon Sha)
 (2006, 1 volume, Kodansha)
 (2007, 1 volume, Kodansha)

Sources:

References

External links
 Seizo Station (official blog)
Lambiek.net Comiclopedia
The World of Seizo Watase

1945 births
Living people
Manga artists
People from Kobe